Derek Blanks (born November 5, 1977) is an American photographer, illustrator, creative director, and producer.

Early life and education
Derek Blanks was born in Jackson, Mississippi on November 5, 1977. His father was a school teacher in Pearl, Mississippi. He is the middle twin of three siblings. Blanks attended Murrah High School in Jackson, Mississippi and enrolled in APAC: The Academic and Performing Arts Complex which exposed him to art at a young age. 

In 2000, Blanks graduated Magna cum laude from the Maryland Institute College of Art (MICA) in Baltimore, Maryland where he received a Bachelor of Fine Arts degree in Illustration. Upon graduation, Blanks worked in commercial design, illustration and freelance photography through work with The Baltimore Sun newspaper and illustrated children's book, "Up in the Learning Tree" published by Lee & Low Books.

Career
Blanks entered into lifestyle and fashion Photography by developing a portfolio with works published by Essence, BET Networks, Sony Music Entertainment, Reach Media Inc. and Ebony.

Alter-Ego photography series
In 2009, Blanks collaborated with NeNe Leakes by photographing the cast of Real Housewives of Atlanta for his Alter Ego portrait series. Blanks photographed several more celebrities for the series including Chaka Khan, Taraji P. Henson, Blair Underwood, Snoop Dogg, Janelle Monáe, Rockmond Dunbar, Hill Harper, Faith Evans, Tisha Campbell-Martin, Brandy, Boris Kodjoe, Terrell Owens, Angela Bassett, Cover Girl, Nicole Ari Parker, Mike Epps, Eva Marcille, Akon, Cedric The Entertainer, Columbus Short, and more.

Print and advertising
In October 2011, Blanks became a cover and features photographer for, Essence. Derek Blanks/ESSENCE covers include Wendy Williams: The Girl Friends Issue, Angela Bassett: Black Women in Hollywood 2011; features include 2011 Do Right Men featuring Amare Stoudemire, A Few Good Men: The Cast of Red Tails, Don Lemon: Transparent and Black Women in Hollywood 2011 featuring Viola Davis, Loretta Devine and Amber Riley of Glee. Other Blanks images have graced the covers and pages of Billboard, Maxim, People, Ebony, Life & Style, PEOPLE en Espanol, Uptown, Jet, Modern Luxury, Runway, Upscale and more.

Blanks has photographed print and advertising campaigns for BET Networks including The Mo'Nique Show, The Game (Season 4 and 5), Let's Stay Together (Season 1 and 2), College Hill: Atlanta and Miami, Baldwin Hills, Reed Between The Lines, Toya: A Family Affair, Family Crews, Monica: Still Standing and Tiny and Toya. Additional print campaigns include WeTv's Braxton Family Values and Mary Mary.

Directing
In late 2011, Blanks began transitioning into the world of video with his directorial music video debut featuring America's Next Top Model contestant Dominique Reighard and "Charades" by Chrisette Michele from Audrey Hepburn: An Audio Visual Presentation and "Party or Go Home" by Trina Braxton. In 2014, Blanks took on the role of music video directing for Faith Evans' single, "I Deserve It", featuring Missy Elliott and Sharaya J.

Credits
Albums and directing
Faith Evans featuring Missy Elliott & Sharaya J – "I Deserve It" (directing role)
BeBe and CeCe Winans – "Still"
Brandy Norwood – Baby Mama feat. Chance The Rapper; alongside Frank Gatson Jr.
CeCe Winans – For Always: The Best of CeCe Winans
CeCe Winans – Songs of Emotional Healing
Ciara – Fantasy Ride
Deitrick Haddon – Church on the Moon
Dondria – Dondria vs. Phatfffat
Donell Jones – "Lyrics"
Faith Evans – Something About Faith
Fantasia – Back to Me
Juanita Bynum – The Diary of Juanita Bynum
Kelly Price – Kelly
Kelly Rowland – Here I Am
Keyshia Cole – Woman to Woman
Lalah Hathaway – Where It All Begins
LaShun Pace – Reborn
Ledisi – Pieces of Me
Mary Mary – "Go Get It"
Monica – New Life
PJ Morton – "Walk Alone"
Richard Smallwood – With Vision... Promises
Ruben Studdard – Letters from Birmingham
Sheri Jones-Moffett – "Renewed"
SWV – I Missed Us
T-Pain – Revolver
Tamela Mann – The Master Plan
Tedd Winn – Balance

Magazine and reality television shoots
 Alter Ego Portrait Series
 Real Housewives of Atlanta Alter Ego Portraits
 The Insider Extreme Makeovers
 Essence Magazine Black Women in Hollywood Luncheon
 Melanie Fiona Alter Ego shoot
 Michelle Williams Alter Ego shoot
 Amber Riley in Essence Magazine

References

External links 

 Video: Derek Blanks: Master of the Camera from 2018, by VOA News

American photographers
American illustrators
Maryland Institute College of Art alumni
Living people
Artists from Atlanta
1977 births